Dragutin Mlinarec (born August 24, 1960 in Čakovec, Yugoslavia) is a retired Slovenian professional ice hockey player.

Career

Club career
In 1977, Mlinarec made his professional debut with HK Kranjska Gora in the Yugoslav Ice Hockey League. He joined HK Acroni Jesenice the following year. Mlinarec played 18 seasons with Jesenice, and one season in 1988-89 with KHL Medvescak. He won 8 Yugoslav Ice Hockey League titles with Jesenice, and one with Medvescak.

International career
Mlinarec played for both the Yugoslavia national ice hockey team and the Slovenia national ice hockey team during his international career. He participated in 8 World Championships, and the Olympic Games in 1984.

References

1960 births
Living people
Sportspeople from Čakovec
HK Acroni Jesenice players
Ice hockey players at the 1984 Winter Olympics
KHL Medveščak Zagreb players
Olympic ice hockey players of Yugoslavia
Slovenian ice hockey defencemen
Yugoslav ice hockey defencemen